Per Ljostveit (21 October 1928 – 17 May 1990) was a Norwegian footballer. He played in seven matches for the Norway national football team from 1954 to 1956.

References

External links
 

1928 births
1990 deaths
Norwegian footballers
Norway international footballers
Place of birth missing
Association footballers not categorized by position